{{DISPLAYTITLE:C27H28N2O3}}
The molecular formula C27H28N2O3 (molar mass: 428.52 g/mol, exact mass: 428.2100 u) may refer to:

 AdipoRon
 Benzodioxolefentanyl